The 2008–09 season was the 97th season in the history of Cambridge United, and the club's fourth consecutive season in the Conference National. After finishing as runners-up and losing in the play-off final during the 2007–08 season, the club were optimistic of a return to the Football League either as champions or through the play-offs.

The club appointed little-known manager Gary Brabin to guide them through the season, who joined from Southport with relatively little managerial experience. He replaced the successful Jimmy Quinn who parted company with the club by mutual consent after lengthy talks with chairman Phillip Law.

The club enjoyed a successful season, although they were not close to catching eventual champions Burton Albion for much of the season. However, in the final months some excellent form, together with the departure of Burton's manager Nigel Clough, saw the gap close and Cambridge could have won the title and promotion on the final day of the season had they beaten rather than drawn at home to Altrincham. As it was they finished runners-up for the second successive season and despite a memorable play-off campaign, which included beating Stevenage Borough 3–0 after extra time in the second leg at the Abbey Stadium to overturn a first-leg deficit, Cambridge lost the play-off final to Torquay United.

Background

Cambridge United were founded in 1912 as Abbey United, named after the Abbey district of Cambridge. For many years they played amateur football until their election to the Football League in 1970. The early 1990s was Cambridge's most successful period; managed by John Beck the club won the first ever play-off final at Wembley Stadium and gained promotion from the Fourth Division before reaching two successive FA Cup quarter finals in 1990 and 1991 and winning the Third Division in 1991. The club reached the play-offs in 1992 but failed in their bid to become founder members of the Premier League. This was the club's highest final league placing to date and since then it has been in almost constant decline.

The following season the club sacked Beck and were relegated from the First Division. Further relegation followed two seasons later. United returned to Division Two but were relegated in 2002. In 2005, after 35 years in the Football League, Cambridge United were relegated into the Football Conference. This brought with it financial difficulties and the club filed for administration, coming out of it three months later after the intervention of sports minister Richard Caborn, but not before selling their Abbey Stadium home to keep the club afloat and closing the youth system.

The club's first season in the Conference National was one of stabilisation, followed by a close shave with relegation. Under the stewardship of Jimmy Quinn, the club recovered in the previous season to finish in the play-off final. However, after despite losing the 1–0 to Exeter City, the club were hoping to build on this relative success under the new management of Gary Brabin following Quinn's departure.

Team kit
The team kit for the season was produced by Vandanel for the second season. The same kit was used as in the previous season, with a white and black away shirt, and amber and black striped home shirt. As for previous seasons, the kit had two different sponsors - local company Global Self Drive at home and Kershaw away.

A special edition play-off final shirt was also released and worn for that match. Produced by Vandanel, the shirt was all amber with limited black trim and sponsored by Kershaw.

Team

First team squad
This table shows the squad as it stood at the end of the season.

Top scorers
Includes matched in the Conference National, FA Cup and FA Trophy. Where total goals are equal, the list is sorted in favour of league goals, and then alphabetical order.

Match results

Pre-season

League

Play-offs

FA Cup

FA Trophy

Conference League Cup

League table

Awards 
Awarded on 2 June 2009.

References

See also 
History of Cambridge United F.C.
2008–09 in English football
2008–09 Football Conference

Cambridge United F.C. seasons
Cambridge United